The Hunua electorate existed three times for the New Zealand House of Representatives beginning in 1978, based at the south end of the Auckland urban area, and named for the Hunua Ranges. It covered different geographical areas over those periods. The electorate was last represented by Andrew Bayly of the National Party before its dissolution in 2020.

Population centres
The 1977 electoral redistribution was the most overtly political since the Representation Commission had been established through an amendment to the Representation Act in 1886, initiated by Muldoon's National Government. As part of the 1976 census, a large number of people failed to fill out an electoral re-registration card, and census staff had not been given the authority to insist on the card being completed. This had little practical effect for people on the general roll, but it transferred Māori to the general roll if the card was not handed in. Together with a northward shift of New Zealand's population, this resulted in five new electorates having to be created in the upper part of the North Island. The electoral redistribution was very disruptive, and 22 electorates were abolished, while 27 electorates were newly created (including Hunua) or re-established.

Population centres of the original electorate included Cockle Bay in the north-west, East Tāmaki in the west, the settlement of Hunua itself, Mangatāwhiri in the south, and Kaiaua in the east. The electorate existed for two parliamentary periods until the 1983 electoral redistribution, when boundary changes forced its abolition ahead of the 1984 election. The north-west corner went to the newly established  electorate, and the remaining part was absorbed by the reconstituted  electorate.

History
The 1978 election was notable in that Labour candidate Malcolm Douglas held an election night majority of 301 votes. However, National candidate Winston Peters claimed irregularities in the vote, and in a 24 May 1979 ruling, a Court-ordered recount resulted in 500 votes being re-classed as informal, giving Peters a majority of 192. Peters was declared elected as of election night.

The electorate was re-created due to the  change to mixed-member proportional (MMP) voting and the resulting reduction in the number of constituencies. The second historical Hunua electorate contained a selection of dormitory towns in south Auckland, of which Papakura was the largest.

The new Hunua electorate was based around the southern and eastern fringes of the Auckland region, and contained the Franklin District towns of Pukekohe, Waiuku, Bombay, as well as Clevedon, Whitford and Maraetai from eastern Manukau. The resurrected Hunua electorate officially replaced the redrawn and renamed electorate of Port Waikato.

Hunua was abolished again for the 2020 general election, with the eastern half being incorporated into , a small section around Ormiston and Mission Heights becoming part of the new  electorate, and the western half being merged into a recreated .

Members of Parliament
Key

List MPs
Members of Parliament elected from party lists in elections where that person also unsuccessfully contested the Hunua electorate. Unless otherwise stated, all MPs terms began and ended at general elections.

Election results

2017 election

2014 election

2011 election

Electorate (as at 26 November 2011): 47,215

2008 election

1999 election

1996 election

1981 election

1978 election

Table footnotes

Notes

References

Historical electorates of New Zealand
Politics of the Auckland Region
1978 establishments in New Zealand
1984 disestablishments in New Zealand
1996 establishments in New Zealand
2002 disestablishments in New Zealand
2008 disestablishments in New Zealand